is an original Japanese anime television series produced by P.A. Works, and directed by Masakazu Hashimoto. The series aired from April 10 to September 25, 2020. A manga adaptation by Ahndongshik was serialized in Kadokawa Shoten's Young Ace magazine from April 2020 to January 2022.

Plot
Set around the start of the Meiji era in Japan, an eccentric inventor and second son of a respected merchant family, Appare Sorano, decides one day to set off on an adventure. However, the samurai Kosame Isshiki is tasked with keeping Appare's eccentric behavior in check. While trying to drag Appare back to Japan, Kosame accidentally strands them both at sea, until they are saved at the last moment by a passing American steamship. Now stuck in Los Angeles with no money and no easy way to return to Japan, Appare and Kosame decide to enter the "Trans-America Wild Race," where Appare gets the chance to build a custom automobile and Kosame gets the opportunity to earn enough money to return home. The two of them will have to work together while fighting off other rival racers, bandits, and other challenges as they try to win the race.

Characters

The second son of the Sorano merchant family. Much to his family's dismay, Appare doesn't care much for social norms or inheriting the family business, instead spending his time inventing new gadgets and studying various scientific texts. He was inspired from a very young age when he got a copy of the Jules Verne novel From the Earth to the Moon. He decides to enter Trans-America Wild Race in his own steam-powered vehicle.

The head instructor of his family's dojo and a samurai under Lord Kuroda. Kosame was tasked by his Lord with keeping Appare under control, but was dragged with him to America after a series of accidents. Despite being a strong samurai, he has PTSD from an incident in his past and has trouble attacking another person.

A Native American boy from a northeastern tribe (possible the Hopi based on his name's etymology) whose father was killed and family displaced by a man with a snake tattoo on his neck. After being rescued from thugs in Los Angeles, he joins Appare and Kosame while hoping to hunt down his father's killer.

A Chinese-American general assistant for an auto-racing team who dreams of becoming a racer, only to be denied due to prejudice against women. She secretly drives the team's cars at night and befriends Appare and Kosame. After an altercation with the team driver, she earns the owner's grudging respect and he provides her with an old car to enter the Trans-America Wild Race herself.

A wealthy European (French in the English dub) from the family that owns one of the three B.I.G. Boss auto companies, BNW. He seeks to win the Trans-America Wild Race to prove to his family that he should be the heir to the company.

Al's self-proclaimed "chaperone" and assistant whose mother serves as a domestic maid to Al's family.

An engineer for General Motors (G.M.) and an organizer of the Trans-America Wild Race, with ambitions of running the company.

A top racer driving for G.M. in the Trans-America Wild Race and a skilled gunman. One of the legendary "Thousand Three" outlaws known as "Dylan the Hero."

Known as Crazy TJ, he is another of the legendary "Thousand Three" outlaws who is hired by the Iron Motor Company to drive the Trans-America Wild Race.

Driver for Tlaloc. He began the race under the identity of Gil T. Cigar, but later revealed his true identity as Tristan of the Bad Brothers and that he impersonated Gil at the organizer's request.

Partner and brother of Tristan.
 / 

Competitor in his car the GT3. He is revealed in Episode 8 to be Gil the Butcher, the leader of the legendary "Thousand Three" outlaws. He is hired by a railroad magnate to sabotage the race but decides to use the opportunity to make a profit by holding the train and passengers to ransom. He is the main antagonist of the series.

Production and release
On October 12, 2019, P.A. Works announced that they are producing the 13-episode original anime television series directed and written by Masakazu Hashimoto. Yurie Oohigashi is designing the characters based on the original designs by Ahndongshik, with Shiho Takeuchi handling mechanical designs, and Evan Call composing the series' music. Mia Regina performs the series' opening theme song "I got it!" and the ending song is performed by Showtaro Morikubo. It aired from April 10 to September 25, 2020 on Tokyo MX. On April 17, 2020, it was announced that airings of episode 4 and onward were delayed due to the effects of the ongoing COVID-19 pandemic. On June 9, 2020, it was announced that the anime would restart on July 3, 2020, and the fourth episode premiered on July 24, 2020.

Manga adaptation
A manga adaptation by Ahndongshik was serialized in Kadokawa Shoten's Young Ace magazine from April 3, 2020 to January 4, 2022. It has been collected in three volumes as of December 28, 2021. At Anime NYC 2022, Yen Press announced that they licensed the manga for English publication.

Notes

References

External links
Anime official website 

2020 anime television series debuts
Animated television series about auto racing
Anime postponed due to the COVID-19 pandemic
Anime productions suspended due to the COVID-19 pandemic
Anime with original screenplays
Fictional motorsports in anime and manga
Funimation
Kadokawa Shoten manga
P.A.Works
Seinen manga
Television series set in the 20th century
Television shows set in the United States
Tokyo MX original programming
Yen Press titles